Otay Mesa is a community in the southern section of the city of San Diego, just north of the U.S.–Mexico border.

It is bordered by the Otay River Valley and the city of Chula Vista on the north; Interstate 805 and the neighborhoods of Ocean View Hills and San Ysidro on the west; unincorporated San Diego County on the north and east including East Otay Mesa and the San Ysidro Mountains; and the Otay Centenario borough of Tijuana, Mexico on the south.

Major thoroughfares include Otay Mesa Road/California State Route 905, Otay Valley Road/Heritage Road, Siempre Viva Road, and California State Route 125.  Otay Mesa is the second-least walkable neighborhood of San Diego.

History
Otay is derived from the Kumeyaay language.  Although its meaning is disputed, possible derivations include "otai", meaning "brushy"; "Tou-ti" meaning "big mountain"; or "etaay" meaning "big". Mesa is the Spanish word for plateau, table or tableland.

Aviation pioneer John J. Montgomery made the first controlled flights in the western hemisphere using a series of gliders from the west rim of Otay Mesa in 1883/1884.

The area which now includes Otay Mesa was annexed from San Diego County along with other portions of South San Diego in 1957. Additional annexation of almost four thousand acres was approved in 1985.

Since 2010, seven cross-border tunnels have been found linking Warehouses in Otay Mesa with entry points within Mexico.

Climate
Otay Mesa has a semi-arid climate (Köppen climate classification: Bsk) with mild winters and warm, almost rainless summers.

Border crossings
The Otay Mesa Port of Entry is one of two border crossings within the city of San Diego, the other being the San Ysidro Port of Entry six miles to the west. Trucks are generally instructed to use the border crossing in Otay Mesa instead of the San Ysidro one. Otay Mesa also houses an immigration detention center.

Two miles east of the Otay Mesa border crossing in the unincorporated area of East Otay Mesa, the new Otay Mesa East Port of Entry is planned to be in service as early as 2023.

The Cross Border Xpress (CBX) is a terminal serving and a pedestrian bridge crossing to the main terminal of Tijuana International Airport. This crossing has a  facility in Otay Mesa. It was established by Otay-Tijuana Ventures LLC and had a cost of $78 million and opened in 2015. CBX makes Tijuana Airport the world's first geographically binational airport, because unlike the binational airports serving the Swiss cities of Basel (entirely on French territory) and Geneva (entirely on Swiss territory), the CBX terminal is physically located in the United States but serves an airport whose main terminal and runways are in Mexico.

Highways

 (Future I-905)

Other landmarks and facilities
Located 1.5 miles north of the Mexico-United States Border, is the 603 megawatt Otay Mesa Energy Center, which came online in 2009. This power plant will be joined with the Pio Pico Energy Center peaker, which will generate an additional 300 megawatts.

Pacific Gateway Park is located between Otay Mesa Road and the international border.

Five major law-enforcement facilities are located in an unincorporated area in the Otay Mesa region:

 the state's Richard J. Donovan Correctional Facility
 Otay Mesa Detention Center, privately operated by CoreCivic, formerly called Corrections Corporation of America(CCA)
 the George Bailey County Detention facility
 the East Mesa Detention facility, operated by the City of San Diego
 and a multi-jurisdictional law enforcement firearms training complex used by the FBI, the Customs Service, and local police forces

Education
Otay Mesa is in the San Ysidro School District (SYSD) and the Sweetwater Union High School District (SUHSD).

Public schools in and near Otay Mesa include:

 Finney Elementary School
 Juarez Lincon Elementary School
 Los Altos Elementary School
 Howard Pence Elementary School
 Silverwing Elementary School
 San Ysidro Elementary School

The area is zoned to Montgomery High School.

See also

Mexico–United States border

References

External links
 Otay Mesa community profile, city of San Diego
 Bureau of Transportation Statistics - Border Crossing/Entry Data
 Trans-Border Institute at the University of San Diego
 Mesa de Otay Delegation, Tijuana, Mexico (In Spanish)

Neighborhoods in San Diego
South Bay (San Diego County)